N.K.P. Salve Institute of Medical Sciences is a full-fledged medical college in Nagpur, Maharashtra. The college imparts the degree Bachelor of Medicine and Bachelor of Surgery (MBBS). It is recognised by the Medical Council of India. 

Selection to the college is done on the basis of merit through the National Eligibility and Entrance Test. Yearly undergraduate student intake is 150.

References

External links 
 Official website

Medical colleges in Maharashtra
Universities and colleges in Maharashtra
Affiliates of Maharashtra University of Health Sciences
Educational institutions established in 1990
1990 establishments in Maharashtra